Chorasi Legislative Assembly constituency is one of the 200 Legislative Assembly constituencies of Rajasthan state in India. Chorasi is part of Dungarpur district. The MLA is Rajkumar Roat of Bhartiya Tribal Party.

Members of the Legislative Assembly

References

Assembly constituencies of Rajasthan
Dungarpur district